The Russian route A130 is a Russian federal highway from Moscow to the border with Belarus, where it becomes the P43 to Bobruysk.

Within Moscow Oblast it coincides with the old Kaluga road, until the village of Lvovo. Before the fall of the Soviet Union the A130 (then the A101) was used as a southern alternative to the M1 into Belarus.

The route was given a new designation, A-130, on November 17, 2010 in accordance with Government Resolution №928; the A101 designation was used until the end of 2017.

References

Roads in Russia